Bavi County is in Khuzestan province, Iran. The capital of the county is the city of Mollasani. At the 2006 census, the region's population (as Anaqcheh Rural District and Bavi District of Ahvaz County) was 81,665, in 14,423 households. The following census in 2011 counted 89,160 people in the newly formed Bavi County, in 21,308 households. At the 2016 census, the county's population was 96,484 in 25,597 households.

Administrative divisions

The population history and structural changes of Bavi County's administrative divisions over three consecutive censuses are shown in the following table. The latest census shows two districts, four rural districts, and three cities.

References

 

Counties of Khuzestan Province